The Tomb of Xerxes I is a catacombs located in Marvdasht. This tomb is part of the Naqsh-e Rostam and is Xerxes I's Tomb.

Gallery

Sources

Naqsh-e Rustam
Tourist attractions in Fars Province
Mausoleums in Iran
Buildings and structures in Fars Province
Achaemenid architecture